Joyce F. Brown is the President of the State University of New York (SUNY) Fashion Institute of Technology.

Early life and education 
Born in New York City, she attended parochial schools.

Brown received her B.A. in 1968 from Marymount College in Tarrytown, New York.  She received her master's degree in counseling psychology (1971) as well as her doctorate (1980) from New York University.

Career
Brown has been the President of SUNY's Fashion Institute of Technology, and CEO of the Educational Foundation for the Fashion Industries, in New York City since 1998. She has served on numerous corporate boards, including the Boards of Directors of Neuberger Berman, and the Paxar Corporation, and is on the boards of USEC, Inc. and the Polo Ralph Lauren Corporation.

Brown served as a Professor of Clinical Psychology at the Graduate School and University Center of the City University of New York from 1994 to 1998.  She is now Professor Emerita.

During David Dinkins' term as Mayor of New York City, Brown served as deputy mayor for public and community affairs (1993–94).

Brown was appointed Dean of Urban Affairs at Bernard Baruch College of the City University of New York (CUNY) in 1983 and held the position until 1987.  She coordinated the Urban Summit of Big City Mayors during her tenure and was appointed acting President of the college in 1990 (Brotherton, Phaedra, "FIT to be President" Black Enterprise, July 1999).

Personal life 
She is married to Carl McCall, who served as New York State Comptroller from 1993 to 2002 and ran as the Democratic candidate for Governor of New York in 2002.

References

Living people
Fashion Institute of Technology faculty
1947 births
Spouses of New York (state) politicians